In applied mathematics, the soft configuration model (SCM) is a random graph model subject to the principle of maximum entropy under constraints on the expectation of the degree sequence of sampled graphs. Whereas the configuration model (CM) uniformly samples random graphs of a specific degree sequence, the SCM only retains the specified degree sequence on average over all network realizations; in this sense the SCM has very relaxed constraints relative to those of the CM ("soft" rather than "sharp" constraints). The SCM for graphs of size  has a nonzero probability of sampling any graph of size , whereas the CM is restricted to only graphs having precisely the prescribed connectivity structure.

Model formulation
Imposed on the ensemble are  constraints, namely that the ensemble average of the degree  of vertex  is equal to a designated value , for all . The model is fully parameterized by its size  and expected degree sequence . These constraints are both local (one constraint associated with each vertex) and soft (constraints on the ensemble average of certain observable quantities), and thus yields a canonical ensemble with an extensive number of constraints. The conditions  are imposed on the ensemble by the method of Lagrange multipliers (see Maximum-entropy random graph model).

Derivation of the probability distribution
The probability  of the SCM producing a graph  is determined by maximizing the Gibbs entropy  subject to constraints  and normalization . This amounts to optimizing the multi-constraint Lagrange function below:

 

 

the constant  being the partition function normalizing the distribution; the above exponential expression applies to all , and thus is the probability distribution.

References

Random graphs